"Space Cowboy" is the international lead single from British funk and acid jazz band Jamiroquai's second studio album, The Return of the Space Cowboy (1994). Released on 26 September 1994, the single peaked at number 17 on the UK Singles Chart, number six in Italy, and number three in Iceland. In the United States, it gave the band their first number one on the Billboard Hot Dance Club Play chart. In June 2006, it re-entered the UK Dance Chart at number one. The single contains remixes by David Morales, which further put the single in club circulation.

Background

Three very distinct but relatively well-known versions of the song exist.

The original iteration was recorded with the band's regular bassist Stuart Zender and uses a slap bass technique during the chorus. This version is commonly known as the "Stoned Again Mix" and was largely the version played on radio when the single was released. The full "Stoned Again Mix" was a B-side on the 12" vinyl single, and a shorter 'radio edit' is the version included on the band's 'Greatest Hits' album, High Times: Singles 1992–2006. A lengthy rendition of this version is usually the one performed live, sometimes extended to as much as twelve minutes with additional instrumental parts, including wind instruments not on any recorded version.

The album version is noticeably different; it is considerably longer with a different bassline played not by Stuart Zender but by an artist credited as "Mr. X" in the album sleeve notes. Years later, Zender himself revealed on Instagram that the bass player who played on the song was Paul Powell; however, he affirmed that he wrote the original ("Stoned Again Mix") bassline himself.

Thirdly, a house music-style remix by David Morales, known as the 'Classic Club Remix' became popular in clubs and appears on many dance/club compilations. This appeared on the US single release and a shorter 'Classic Radio' edit was a B-side on the British CD single release of "Virtual Insanity". David Guetta's song "Stay (Don't Go Away)", featuring Raye, samples this remix.

"Space Cowboy" is a frequently covered song, with two notable cover versions: one by Jazzamor, and one by the band Jacarandaa. Cowboy Bebop scriptwriter Keiko Nobumoto said in an interview that the song "Space Cowboy" was one of the inspirations for Cowboy Bebop.

Critical reception
In his weekly UK chart commentary, James Masterton wrote that "Space Cowboy" "deviates little from that winning formula which still does not stop it sounding rather bland to these ears - but a No.17 hit first week out is not to be sniffed at." Pan-European magazine Music & Media commented, "Will the "cap-ophile" neo soul brother be wearing a Stetson for this one? More laidback–or spacy?–than before, he'll be rocketed into the unknown, yet-to-be-explored universum of ACE." They also described it as "ideal radio music". Alan Jones from Music Week noted, "A smooth and slick, downtempo piece of funk with plenty of room for ad-libs and stylish posturings. Augers well for upcoming album." Tim Jeffery from the RM Dance Update said it "is a cool funky track with the emphasis much more on the lyrics than the dancefloor though its rumbling funky bass cuts through powerfully in places and there's a wild breakdown halfway through that raises the excitement level. Otherwise this is jazzy, radio friendly and very much what you'd expect."

Music video

A music video was filmed for "Space Cowboy" using the single version of the song. It was directed by Vaughan Arnell and Anthea Benton, and mainly featured Jay Kay dancing around a blue room with multiple versions of him and the other band members appearing and disappearing. Occasional breaks show the band members against a blacklight with marijuana-leaf motifs. The video makes use of motion control photography to allow a seemingly-continuous shot as the camera pans around the room. In America, another version of the video replaced the leaves with daisies, without Jay's consent . A video of the David Morales remix also exists.

The video of "Space Cowboy" was A-listed on France's MCM in December 1994. Later it was published on YouTube in November 2009, and had generated more than 24 million views as of September 2021.

Track listings

 UK CD single
 "Space Cowboy" – 3:36
 "Journey to Arnhemland" – 5:22
 "The Kids" – 5:01
 "Space Cowboy" (demo version) – 4:17

 Europe 12-inch single
 "Space Cowboy" (edit) – 3:46
 "Journey to Arnhemland" – 5:22
 "Space Cowboy (Stoned Again Mix)" – 6:32

 US 12-inch single
 "Space Cowboy" (album version) – 6:24
 "Space Cowboy" (instrumental) – 3:46
 "Space Cowboy" (radio edit) – 3:36
 "Space Cowboy" (Classic Club Remix) – 7:52
 "Space Cowboy" (Babinstrumental) – 6:45
 "Space Cowboy" (Classic Radio Remix) – 4:01

 2006 digital EP
 "Space Cowboy" (Mayhem & Musaphia Reconstruction Mix) – 8:50
 "Space Cowboy" (Mayhem & Musaphia Deep Dub) – 7:18

Charts

Weekly charts

Year-end charts

Certifications

Release history

References

1994 singles
1994 songs
1995 singles
Jamiroquai songs
Music videos directed by Vaughan Arnell
Songs about cannabis
Songs about drugs
Songs written by Jason Kay
S2 Records singles